The Ministry of Transport and Telecommunications is a government ministry of Chile. Its head office is in Santiago. The current head is Juan Carlos Muñoz.

References

External links

 Ministry of Transport and Telecommunications 

Mass media in Chile
Transport
Chile
Chile
Transport organisations based in Chile